Agnes Geraghty (November 26, 1907 – March 1, 1974), also known by her married name Agnes McAndrews, was an American competition swimmer who represented the United States at the 1924 Summer Olympics and 1928 Summer Olympics.  At the 1924 Olympics in Paris, she won a silver medal in the women's 200-meter breaststroke with a time of 3:34.0.  Four years later at the 1928 Olympics in Amsterdam, she was fourth in her semifinal of the 200-meter breaststroke event and did not advance.

See also
 List of Olympic medalists in swimming (women)

References

External links
 
 
 

1907 births
1974 deaths
American female breaststroke swimmers
Medalists at the 1924 Summer Olympics
Olympic silver medalists for the United States in swimming
Sportspeople from New York City
Swimmers at the 1924 Summer Olympics
Swimmers at the 1928 Summer Olympics
20th-century American women
20th-century American people